Mickinock Township is a township in Roseau County, Minnesota, United States. The population was 302 at the 2000 census.

History
Mickinock Township was named for an Ojibwe chief.

Geography

Demographics
At the 2000 census, there were 302 people, 111 households and 86 families residing in the township. The racial make-up of the township was 98.34% White, 0.33% African American, 0.33% Native American and 0.99% from two or more races.

There were 111 households, of which 36.0% had children under the age of 18 living with them, 73.0% were married couples living together, 2.7% had a female householder with no husband present and 22.5% were non-families. 18.0% of all households were made up of individuals and 10.8% had someone living alone who was 65 years of age or older. The average household size was 2.72 and the average family size was 3.13.

28.8% of the population were under the age of 18, 6.0% from 18 to 24, 28.8% from 25 to 44, 23.8% from 45 to 64 and 12.6% were 65 years of age or older. The median age was 38 years. For every 100 females, there were 112.7 males. For every 100 females age 18 and over, there were 115.0 males.

The median household income was $48,281 and the median family income was $55,000. Males had a median income of $29,750 and females $25,893. The per capita income was $17,697. About 4.9% of families and 7.5% of the population were below the poverty line, including 9.2% of those under the age of eighteen and 24.4% of those 65 or over.

References

Townships in Roseau County, Minnesota
Townships in Minnesota